Gorka González Larrañaga (born September 28, 1977) is a Spanish former professional road bicycle racer, who rode professionally between 2002 and 2006, entirely for the  team. González was the only one out of 189 enlisted riders who was not allowed to start in the 2004 Tour de France after failing a health-test prior to the race, due to a high hematocrit value. He was suspended for two weeks. His team Euskadi was not allowed a substitute and started that year's Tour, which included a Team Time Trial, with 8 riders.

Major results

2005
 1st Stage 5 Vuelta a Burgos

External links

1977 births
Living people
Spanish male cyclists
Cyclists from the Basque Country (autonomous community)
People from Zarautz
Sportspeople from Gipuzkoa